Vitaliy Mikheyev, is a Ukrainian strongman competitor.

In 2009 began his career as a strongman.

External links 
 Interview with strongman

Living people
People from Vyshneve
Ukrainian strength athletes
Year of birth missing (living people)
Sportspeople from Kyiv Oblast